The Argentina national football team represents Argentina in men's international football and is administered by the Argentine Football Association, the governing body for football in Argentina.

Nicknamed La Albiceleste ('The White and Sky Blue'), they are the reigning world champions, having won the most recent World Cup in 2022. Overall, Argentina has appeared in a World Cup final six times; a record equalled by Italy and surpassed only by Brazil and Germany. Argentina played in the first ever final in 1930, which they lost 4–2 to Uruguay. The next final appearance came 48 years later, in 1978, when the team captained by Daniel Passarella defeated the Netherlands 3–1 in extra time, being crowned world champions for the first time. Captained by Diego Maradona, Argentina won their second World Cup eight years later, in 1986, with a 3–2 final victory over West Germany. They reached the final once more under the guidance of Maradona, in 1990, but were ultimately beaten 1–0 by West Germany. A few decades later, Argentina led by Lionel Messi made their fifth final appearance in 2014, losing to Germany 1–0 after extra time. In 2022, again captained by Messi, they were crowned the world champions for the third time, the fourth-most of any country, beating France 4–2 on penalties, following a 3–3 draw after extra time.

The team's World Cupwinning managers are César Luis Menotti in 1978, Carlos Bilardo in 1986 and Lionel Scaloni in 2022. Since the Golden Ball for tournament's best player has been officially awarded by FIFA from 1982, Argentina players have won it thrice; Maradona in 1986 and Messi in 2014 and 2022. Argentines Guillermo Stábile in 1930 and Mario Kempes in 1978 were the top-scoring players at their respective World Cups.

Argentina has also been very successful in the Copa América, winning it 15 times, a record shared with Uruguay, most recently winning the 2021 edition. The team also won the inaugural FIFA Confederations Cup in 1992. Argentina is the most successful team in the CONMEBOL–UEFA Cup of Champions, having won it twice, in 1993 and 2022. Argentina is known for having rivalries with Brazil, Uruguay, England, Germany and the Netherlands. As of 2022, Argentina holds the record for most official titles won by a men's national team with 22. Individually for Argentina, Lionel Messi is the all-time most-capped player with 172 games and the highest goalscorer with 98 goals.

History

The first ever match Argentina played was against Uruguay, on 20 June 1902. The game, which was the first international for both sides, was held in Montevideo, and Argentina won 6–0. During the first years of its existence, Argentina only played friendly matches against other South American teams. The reasons for this varied, including long travel times between countries and the interruption due to World War I.

La Albiceleste has appeared in World Cup finals six times, including the first ever final in 1930, which they lost 4–2 to Uruguay. Argentina won their next final in 1978, beating the Netherlands 3–1. Eight years later, in 1986, Argentina led by Diego Maradona won their second title with a 3–2 victory over West Germany. Under the guidance of Maradona, they reached the final again, in 1990, but ultimately lost 1–0 to West Germany, by a much-disputed penalty. Led by Lionel Messi, Argentina reached the final in 2014, where they were beaten 1–0 by Germany in extra time. In 2022, again under the captaincy of Messi, Argentina won their third World Cup, beating France 4–2 on penalties, following a 3–3 draw after extra time. The team's World Cupwinning managers are César Luis Menotti in 1978, Carlos Bilardo in 1986 and Lionel Scaloni in 2022.

Argentina has also been very successful in the South American Football Championship, the Copa América, winning it 15 times, a record it shares with Uruguay; they were crowned champions most recently in 2021. The team also won the inaugural FIFA Confederations Cup in 1992 and the CONMEBOL–UEFA Cup of Champions in 1993 and 2022.

In March 2007, Argentina reached the top of the FIFA Men's World Ranking for the first time.

Home stadium

Argentina plays most of its home matches at River Plate's stadium, Estadio Monumental, in Buenos Aires, although the team also uses various other venues frequently, such as Estadio Único Madre de Ciudades and Boca Juniors' stadium, La Bombonera. Those venues, along with Estadio Mario Alberto Kempes and Estadio San Juan del Bicentenario, were used for the 2022 World Cup qualification. Additionally, Argentina played some matches at Rosario Central during their 2010 World Cup qualifying campaign.

GEBA Stadium was the first stadium Argentina used for its home matches; that includes the Copa Newton match against Uruguay held on 13 September 1908, which has a historic significance for being the first time Argentina wore the light blue and white-striped jersey in an official game, which has since then been the defining uniform up to the present day. GEBA was also used for the Copa Centenario Revolución de Mayo, the first competition held between South American national teams, considered the predecessor of Copa América, organised by the Argentine Football Association (AFA) in 1910. Most recently, Argentina played at GEBA on 19 October 1919, winning the Copa Premier Honor Argentino after a 6–1 victory over Uruguay.

Furthermore, Estadio Sportivo Barracas is also considered a memorable venue for Argentina; the stadium was commonly used by Argentina from 1920 to 1932. Playing at the stadium for La Albiceleste on 2 October 1924, forward Cesáreo Onzari scored directly from a corner kick, the first such incident in football, when Argentina beat Uruguay 2–1; such goals are now often referred as Olympic goals due to the fact that Argentina had just won the 1924 Olympic title. Sportivo Barracas was later demolished after 1936.

Team image

Kit 

The first kit ever worn by Argentina, in their official debut against Uruguay in 1902, included a light blue shirt. On 2 July 1908, Argentina debuted a shirt with light blue vertical stripes on a white jersey, which they used when they played a side formed of Liga Paulista players at Velódromo Paulistano; they used the jersey in an official game against Uruguay on 13 September 1908, and the striped jersey has remained as the definitive kit for Argentina ever since then. The team's away kits have been in dark blue shades, with the colours of shorts and socks varying from time to time.

Argentina has also sported other kits; on 3 June 1919 in Rio de Janeiro, playing against Brazil, Argentina wore a light blue kit, similar to that of Uruguay, out of respect for Roberto Chery, a substitute goalkeeper for Uruguay, who had collapsed and died during a match against Chile at the 1919 South American Championship; the game between Argentina and Brazil was organised by the Brazilian Football Confederation for the benefit of Chery's relatives. At the 1958 World Cup, Argentina wore the yellow jersey of Swedish club IFK Malmö against West Germany, as the team had arrived in Sweden without an away kit.

At the 1986 World Cup in Mexico, the then manager, Carlos Bilardo, asked the team's kit supplier, Le Coq Sportif, for lighter blue shirts for their quarter-final against England in three days, but they could not be provided. Then, a member of the coaching staff scoured the shops of Mexico City for 38 plain shirts, which were transformed with an improvised version of the AFA emblem embroidered on to the shirts and silvery American football numbers ironed to the backs. Sporting the makeshift jerseys, Argentina beat England on 22 June, with Diego Maradona scoring his famous "Hand of God goal". Afterwards, the shirt became a symbol of the occasion and an important collector's item.

At the 2018 World Cup in Russia, Argentina debuted a black away kit; and at the 2022 FIFA World Cup in Qatar, they wore a purple away kit in a competitive game for the first time.

Kit suppliers

Crest
Argentina has used the logo of the Argentine Football Association as its emblem since it was first worn at the 1958 World Cup in Sweden; the logo was added to the team's jackets, but not the shirts. The emblem was not used on jerseys until 16 November 1976, when Argentina played the Soviet Union at Estadio Monumental. At the beginning, the crest used did not include a laurel wreath, which was first added for the 1982 World Cup.

As a common practice, two stars were added above the crest in 2004, symbolising Argentina's World Cup titles in 1978 and 1986. In 2022, a third star was added after Argentina were crowned world champions for the third time.

Results and fixtures

The following is a list of match results from the previous 12 months, as well as any future matches that have been scheduled.

2022

2023

Coaching staff

Manager history 

 Sources:

 Pedro Calomino (1921) 
 Ángel Vázquez (1924–25)
 José Lago Millán (1927–28)
 Francisco Olazar (1929)
 Francisco Olazar &  Juan J. Tramutola (1929–1930)
 Felipe Pascucci (1934)
 Manuel Seoane (1935–37)
 Ángel Fernández Roca (1937–1939)
 Guillermo Stábile (1939–1958)
 José Manuel Moreno (1959)
 Guillermo Stábile (1960)
 Victorio Spinetto (1960–61)
 José D'Amico (1962)
 Juan Carlos Lorenzo (1962)
 Néstor Rossi (1962)
 Jim Lópes (1962)
 Horacio A. Torres (1963–64)
 José D'Amico (1964)
 José María Minella (1964–65)
 Osvaldo Zubeldía (1965)
 Juan Carlos Lorenzo (1966)
 Jim Lópes (1967)
 Carmelo Faraone (1967)
 Renato Cesarini (1967–68)
 José María Minella (1968)
 Humberto Maschio (1968–69)
 Adolfo Pedernera (1969)
 Juan José Pizzuti (1970–72)
 Omar Sívori (1972–73)
 Vladislao Cap (1974)
 César Menotti (1974–83)
 Carlos Bilardo (1983–90)
 Alfio Basile (1990–94)
 Daniel Passarella (1994–98)
 Marcelo Bielsa (1998–2004)
 José Pékerman (2004–06)
 Alfio Basile (2006–08)
 Diego Maradona (2008–10)
 Sergio Batista (2010–11)
 Alejandro Sabella (2011–14)
 Gerardo Martino (2014–16)
 Edgardo Bauza (2016–17)
 Jorge Sampaoli (2017–18)
 Lionel Scaloni (2018–present)

Players

Current squad
The following 33 players were named in the squad for friendlies against Panama and Curaçao on 23 and 28 March 2023, respectively. On the 14th of March Alejandro Garnacho withdrew due to an ankle injury. On 17th of March Alejandro Gomez had to withdrew from the squad due an ankle injury recovery.

Caps and goals are correct as of 18 December 2022, after the match against France.

Recent call-ups
The following players have been called up for the team in the last twelve months.

COV Withdrew from the squad due to quarantine or infection by COVID-19
INJ Withdrew due to injury
PRE Preliminary squad
RET Retired from the national team
SUS Suspended

Individual records and achievements 

Players in bold are still active with Argentina.

Most-capped players

Top goalscorers

World Cup-winning captains

Caps
 Most-capped player: 172, Lionel Messi, 2005–
 Youngest player: Diego Maradona,  old against Hungary on 27 February 1977
 Youngest player to appear in a FIFA World Cup match: Lionel Messi,  old against Serbia and Montenegro on 16 June 2006
 Oldest player: Ángel Labruna,  old against Czechoslovakia at the 1958 FIFA World Cup on 15 June

Goals
 Most goals scored: 98, Lionel Messi, 2005–
 Oldest goalscorer: Martín Palermo, 36 years and 7 months old in 2010 against Greece
 Youngest goalscorer: Diego Maradona, 18 years, 7 months and 4 days old in 1979 against Scotland
 Youngest player to score in a FIFA World Cup match: Lionel Messi, 18 years and 357 days, against Serbia and Montenegro in 2006
 Most goals scored in a single match: 5 – Manuel Seoane in 1925, Juan Marvezzi in 1941, Lionel Messi in 2022
 Most goals scored in a calendar year: 18 – Lionel Messi in 2022
 Most goals scored at FIFA World Cup finals : 13 – Lionel Messi

Manager records 
 Most games coached: 127, Guillermo Stábile. During his tenure, he won the South American Championship six times with Argentina, in 1941, the 1945, 1946, 1947, 1955 and 1957.

World Cup awards and achievements 
World Cup Golden Ball

The World Cup Golden Ball has been given by FIFA to the best player at the World Cup since 1982; Argentina players have won it thrice; Maradona in 1986 and Messi in 2014 and 2022.

World Cup top goalscorer

Guillermo Stábile in 1930 and Mario Kempes in 1978 were both the top-scoring players at their respective World Cups.

World Cup Golden Glove

The best goalkeeper at the World Cup is awarded the FIFA World Cup Golden Glove. In 2022 this award was won by Emiliano Martínez.

World Cup Young Player Award

The best player at the World Cup who is no older than 21 during the calendar year of the tournament is awarded the FIFA World Cup Young Player Award. In 2022 this award was won by Enzo Fernández.

Competitive record
 Champions   Runners-up   Third place   Tournament played fully or partially on home soil

FIFA World Cup

*Draws include knockout matches decided on penalty kicks.

Copa América

FIFA Confederations Cup

CONMEBOL–UEFA Cup of Champions

*Draws include knockout matches decided on penalty kicks.

Olympic Games

Head-to-head record

Below is a result summary of all matches Argentina has played against FIFA recognised teams.

Rivalries

Brazil

Argentina and Brazil have a strong rivalry which is one of the oldest in South America. Games between the two teams, even those that are only friendly matches, are often marked by notable and controversial incidents. The rivalry has also been referred to as the "Battle of the Americas." FIFA has described it as the "essence of football rivalry". CNN ranked it second on their top 10 list of international football rivalries—only below the older England–Scotland football rivalry.

The rivalry has extended to comparisons between Pelé and Diego Maradona. Some of their countrymen also feature regularly in such debates. The next most notable pair are perhaps Garrincha (Brazilian) and Alfredo Di Stéfano (Argentine). The most dominant figures from the two countries in the modern game are Neymar (Brazilian) and Lionel Messi (Argentine). Both Pelé and Maradona have declared Neymar and Messi their respective "successors".

England

With a rivalry stemming from the 1966 World Cup and intensified by the Falklands War of 1982, Argentina and England have had numerous confrontations in World Cup tournaments. Among them was the quarter-final match in 1986, where Diego Maradona scored two goals against England. The first was a handball, but was ruled legal by the referee. The second, scored minutes later, saw Maradona passing five England outfield players before scoring, and is often described as one of the greatest goals in football history.

The nations were paired together in the Round of 16 at the 1998 FIFA World Cup, won by Argentina on penalties, and again at the group stage in 2002, England winning 1–0 through a penalty by David Beckham who had been sent off in the tie four years earlier.

Germany

Argentina has played Germany in seven FIFA World Cup matches including three FIFA World Cup finals: In 1986 Argentina won 3–2, but in 1990 it was the Germans who were the victors by a 1–0 scoreline.

In 1958 they met for the first time in the group stage, where Argentina suffered a 1–3 loss to defending champions West Germany. In 1966 both again faced each other in the group stage which ended in a scoreless draw. In 2006, they met in the quarter-finals; Argentina lost on penalties after a 1–1 draw, which was followed by a brawl on the pitch involving several players. They met again at the same stage in 2010, this time ending with a 4–0 victory for Germany. They played each other for the third consecutive World Cup in the Brazil 2014 event's final, where Argentina was defeated in extra time by a score of 1–0.

Uruguay

Argentina has a long-standing rivalry with its neighbour, that came into existence from the early South American Championships, the 1928 Summer Olympics and the first World Cup final, held in 1930.

Argentina and Uruguay hold the record for most international matches played between two countries. The two teams have faced each other 197 times since 1902. The first match between Argentina and Uruguay was also the first official international match to be played outside the United Kingdom.

Mexico 

Although the first official match between both nations came in the 1930 FIFA World Cup where Argentina beat Mexico 6–3 on group stage, the rivalry emerged during the late twentieth century, especially after the 1993 Copa América Final, where Argentina beat Mexico 2–1. That was the first time a non-CONMEBOL nation played in a Copa América final, and the first final played between both sides.

The rivalry has continued in club competitions, where Argentine and Mexicans first met in 1968 Copa Interamericana. The rivalry between both nations at club level increased during the late 1990s, when Mexican clubs were invited to participate in Copa Libertadores, where they played memorable matches v Boca Juniors.

During the 2022 FIFA World Cup held in Qatar, some Mexican and Argentine fans had a fight in Doha prior to the match between both sides, among great animosity. Both supporters fought again inside Lusail Stadium after the match that Argentina won 2–0, giving Argentina a chance to qualify and forcing Mexico to win against Saudi Arabia to qualify, which ended with Argentina and Poland qualifying and Mexico being eliminated alongside Saudi Arabia.

Still, the sense of rivalry here is more keenly felt by Mexican supporters than Argentines, since Argentines do not consider Mexico as big of a rival as Brazil, Uruguay, Germany or England.

Nigeria
A minor rivalry developed from the 1990s between Argentina and Nigeria, based not on geographical proximity, long-term battles for honours or factors outside football, but due to the frequency of significant matches between them. This has included five World Cup group games, all won by Argentina by a single goal margin: 2–1 in 1994, 1–0 in 2002, 1–0 in 2010, 3–2 in 2014 and 2–1 in 2018. The fixture is the most common in the competition's history involving an African nation, and has occurred in five of the six tournaments for which Nigeria has qualified. The sides also met in the 1995 King Fahd Cup (the predecessor to the Confederations Cup) as champions of their respective continents, drawing 0–0.

Below full international level, their Olympic teams also faced off in the gold medal match in 1996 (3–2 to Nigeria), and 2008 (1–0 to Argentina). The final of the 2005 FIFA World Youth Championship was also played between them; both Argentina goals in their 2–1 win were scored by Lionel Messi, who would go on to find the net for the senior team in the 2014 and 2018 World Cup fixtures.

The sense of rivalry is more keenly felt on the Nigerian side, as Argentina has won almost all of their encounters, so they do not consider Nigeria as big of a rival as Brazil, England or Germany, in contrast to the West Africans who remain keen to finally overcome a more illustrious foe.

Netherlands

Honours

Official
 FIFA World Cup
  Champions (3): 1978, 1986, 2022
  Runners-up (3): 1930, 1990, 2014
 South American Championship / Copa América
  Champions (15): 1921, 1925, 1927, 1929, 1937, 1941, 1945, 1946, 1947, 1955, 1957, 1959, 1991, 1993, 2021
  Runners-up (14): 1916, 1917, 1920, 1923, 1924, 1926, 1935, 1942, 1959, 1967, 2004, 2007, 2015, 2016
  Third place (5): 1919, 1956, 1963, 1989, 2019
 Fourth place (2): 1922, 1987
 Panamerican Championship
  Champions (1): 1960
  Runners-up (1): 1956
 FIFA Confederations Cup
  Champions (1): 1992
  Runners-up (2): 1995, 2005
 CONMEBOL–UEFA Cup of Champions
  Champions (2): 1993, 2022

Olympic team 

 Olympic Games
 Silver medal (1): 1928

Friendly
  Newton Cup (17): 1906, 1907, 1908, 1909, 1911, 1916, 1918, 1924, 1927, 1928, 1937, 1942, 1945, 1957, 1973, 1975, 1976 (record)
  Lipton Cup (18): 1906, 1907, 1908, 1909, 1913, 1915, 1916, 1917, 1918, 1928, 1937, 1942, 1945, 1957, 1962, 1968, 1976, 1992 (record)
  Copa Premier Honor Argentino (7): 1909, 1911, 1913, 1914,1918, 1919, 1980 (record)
  Copa Centenario Revolución de Mayo (1): 1910
  Copa Premier Honor Uruguayo (5): 1915, 1916, 1917, 1923, 1924
  Copa Juan Mignaburu (5): 1935, 1936, 1938, 1940, 1943 (record)
  Copa Héctor Rivadavia Gómez (3): 1935, 1936, 1943 (record)
  Roca Cup (4): 1923, 1939, 1940, 1971 (shared)
  Superclásico de las Américas (2): 2017, 2019
  Nations' Cup (1): 1964
  Kirin Cup (2): 1992, 2003
  Copa Times of India (1): 2011
  San Juan Cup (1): 2019

Chronology of titles

Summary

Notes

See also
 List of Argentina international footballers
 Argentina national under-23 football team
 Argentina national under-20 football team
 Argentina national under-17 football team
 Vamos, vamos, Argentina

Notes and references

Notes

References

External links

  
 Argentina national football team at FIFA

 
FIFA Confederations Cup-winning countries
FIFA World Cup-winning countries
South American national association football teams
Football teams in Argentina